Enrico Bomba (born 2 August 1922-?) was an Italian movie producer, director, and screenwriter. He also worked in television. He was born in Amatrice, Province of Rieti, Italy.

Career
Bomba worked in various capacities from 1949 onward. In 1952, he directed his first film, Prigionieri delle tenebre (Prisoners of Darkness); and in the following year he commenced a film called Jezebel, although it was never completed.

In the 1960s/1970s, he worked steadily as a director and screenwriter, directing two films featuring Agent 777 (under the name Henry Bay) and two decamerotici (films inspired by The Decameron). In 1975, he dedicated himself to dubbing foreign language films, working as director and dialogist. Among the voiceovers that he edited the Japanese anime TV series, Great Mazinger and two works taken from the French novel Sans Famille: the anime TV series Nobody's Boy: Remi, and the French television miniseries Sans Famille. During the late 1970s, he made three more films for Cinestampa Internazionale which involved the work of anime artist Gō Nagai. He retired in the early 1990s.

Personal life and death
Enrico Bomba married Giannina Gianni in 1946. Together they had two children, Ernesto born in 1948 and Maria Elisabetta “Camilla” born in 1951. At this time he was the brother in law of Tito Marconi, the  president of Luce Fattorosi in Cinecittà. 
Bomba then had an affair with Jayne Mansfield in Italy in 1962, while she was married to Mickey Hargitay. Subsequently he married voice actress Germana Dominici. They had a daughter, Federica Bomba. His father-in-law was film and voice actor Arturo Dominici. Enrico Bomba predeceased Dominici.

Filmography

As director
 Prisoners of Darkness (1952)
 Love and Faith/Oh Islam (1961, also producer)
 Secret Agent 777 (1965, as Henry Bay)
 Agente segreto 777 - Invito ad uccidere (1966, as Henry Bay)
 Aretino's Blue Stories (1972, decamerotici)
 Le mille e una notte... e un'altra ancora! (A thousand and one nights ... and yet another!) (1973, decamerotici)

As producer
 Love and Poison (1952)
 Sul ponte dei sospiri (1953)
 Oh Islam/Love and Faith (1961, also director)
 Il ratto delle sabine (Romulus and the Sabines, 1961)
 No Man's Land(1962, starred Roger Moore)
 Scarlet Eye/The Dead Eye of Ceylon (1963, starred Lex Barker)
 Last Plane to Baalbek (1964, starred Rossana Podestà )

References
 British Film Institute
 
 My Movies

Citation

1922 births
Year of death missing
Italian film directors
Italian film producers
People from the Province of Rieti